The 2019 WBSC Men's Softball World Championship is an international softball tournament taking place in Prague and Havlíčkův Brod, Czech Republic from 13–23 June 2019. It will be the 16th edition of the tournament. This marks the first time the World Championship was held in Europe.

New Zealand is the defending champion.

Pools composition

Preliminary round

Pool A

Note: MEX - CZE 2:3; CUB - CZE 4:5; MEX - CUB 2:7

Pool B

Note: RSA - SGP 3:4; SGP - NED 0:13; RSA - NED 7:0

Play-offs

Placement Round 5th–8th place

Placement Round 9th–16th place

Final standings

External links
Official Website

References

World Championship
Softball World Championship, 2019
Men's Softball World Championship
Softball World Championship, 2019
Softball World Championship